João de Barros (1496 – 20 October 1570), called the Portuguese Livy, is one of the first great Portuguese historians, most famous for his Décadas da Ásia ("Decades of Asia"), a history of the Portuguese in India, Asia, and southeast Africa.

Early years
Educated in the palace of Manuel I of Portugal, he composed, at the age of twenty, a romance of chivalry, the Chronicle of the Emperor Clarimundo, in which he is said to have had the assistance of Prince John (later King John III). 

Upon ascending the throne, King John III awarded Barros the captaincy of the fortress of St George of Elmina, to which he proceeded in 1524. In 1525, he obtained the post of treasurer of the India House, which he held until 1528.

To escape from an outbreak of bubonic plague in 1530 Barros moved from Lisbon to his country house near Pombal, where he finished a moral dialogue, Rho pica Pneuma, which was praised by Juan Luís Vives. On his return to Lisbon in 1532 the king appointed Barros factor of the "Casa da Índia e da Mina" (House of India and Mina)— a position of great responsibility and importance at a time when Lisbon was the European center for the trade of the East. Barros proved a good administrator, displaying great industry and an honesty rare at the time, with the result that he made little profit compared to his predecessors, who had amassed fortunes.

The failed captaincy in Brazil and shipwreck

At this time, John III, wishing to attract settlers to Brazil, divided it into captaincies and attributed to Barros that of Maranhão. Barros, along with two partners, prepared an armada of ten vessels, carrying nine hundred men each, which set sail in 1539.

Owing to the ignorance of the pilots, the whole fleet was shipwrecked, which entailed serious financial loss to Barros. As a gesture of goodwill, Barros subsequently paid the debts of those who had perished in the expedition.

During these years he had continued his studies in his leisure hours, and shortly after the Brazilian disaster he offered to write a history of the Portuguese in India, the Décadas da Ásia, which the king accepted. He began work forthwith, but, before printing the first part, he published a Portuguese grammar (1539) and some further moral Dialogues. His 1543 text Diálogo evangélico sobre os artigos da fé contra o Talmud dos Judeus makes anti-Jewish remarks.

Decades of Asia

The first of the Décadas da Ásia ("Decades of Asia") appeared in 1552, and its reception was such that the king straightway charged Barros to write a chronicle of King Manuel. His many occupations, however, prevented him from undertaking this book, which was finally composed by Damião de Góis. The second Decade came out in 1553 and the third in 1563, but he died before publishing the fourth Decade. The latter was published posthumously in 1615 at Madrid by the Cosmographer and Chronicler-Royal Joao Baptista Lavanha, who edited and compiled Barros' scattered manuscript.

His Decades contain the early history of the Portuguese in India and Asia and reveal careful study of Eastern historians and geographers, as well as of the records of his own country. They are distinguished by clearness of exposition and orderly arrangement. They are also lively accounts, for example describing the king of Viantana's killing of the Portuguese ambassadors to Malacca with boiling water and then throwing their bodies to the dogs.

Diogo de Couto continued the Décadas, adding nine more, and a modern edition of the whole appeared in Lisbon in 14 vols. in 1778—1788 as Da Asia de João de Barros, dos feitos que os Portuguezes fizeram no descubrimento e conquista dos mares e terras do Oriente. The edition is accompanied by a volume containing a life of Barros by the historian Manoel Severim de Faria and a copious index of all the Decades.

Later years
In January 1568 Barros retired from his remunerative appointment at the India House, receiving the rank of fidalgo together with a pension and other pecuniary emoluments from King Sebastian, and died on 20 October 1570.

Works 

 (1520) Chronica do Emperador Clarimundo, donde os Reys de Portugal descendem, tirada da linguagem ungara em a nossa portugueza.. Coimbra: João da Barreira.
 (1532) Rhopica Pneuma, ou mercadoria espiritual. Lisbon
 (1539) Cartinha para aprender a ler, Lisbon: L. Rodrigues.
 (1540) Grammatica da lingua portuguesa, Lisbon:L. Rodrigues.
 (1540) Dialogo da viciosa vergonha, Lisbon: L. Rodrigues.
 (1540) Dialogo de preceitos moraes com pratica delles em modo de jogo. Lisbon: L. Rodrigues.
 (1543) Diálogo evangélico sobre os artigos da fé contra o Talmud dos Judeus
 (1552) Primeira Década da Ásia, dos feitos que os Portugueses fizeram no descobrimento dos mares e terras do Oriente, Lisbon: Germão Galherde
 (1553) Segunda Década da Ásia &c. Lisbon: Germão Galherde
 (1562) Italian translation of Dec. I & Dec. II by Alfonso Ulloa, l'Asia del S. Giovanni di Barros Consigliero del Christianissimo Re di Portugallo de Fatti de' Portughesi nello scropimento, e conquista de' mari, e terre di Oriente.  Venice: Vicenzo, Valgrisio
 (1563) Terceira Década da Ásia &c., Lisbon: João da Barreira.
 (1613) Quarta Década da Ásia &c. (as edited and reworked by cosmógrafo-mor João Baptista Lavanha), Madrid: Imprensa Real.
 (1628) New edition of Dec.I-III. Lisbon: Jorge Rodrigues.
 (1777–78) Da Ásia de João de Barros e Diogo do Couto, dos feitos que os portugueses fizeram no descobrimento dos mares e terras do Oriente, Lisbon: Régia Officina Typografica. (24 volumes;  vols. 1-8 are reprints of Dec. I-IV of João de Barros; vol. 9 general index for Barros; vol. 10-23 are reprints of Dec. IV-XII of Diogo do Couto, vol. 24 general index for Couto. online (pdfs)

Notes

References
  
 Manoel Severim de Faria "Vida de João de Barros", 1778, in vol. 9 of ''Da Ásia de João de Barros e Diogo do Couto, Lisbon.

Additional reading

External links
 Portuguese Site about João de Barros containing information about his life and work - by Bruno Figueiredo
 Barros:Decadas da Ásia … - links to scans of all 4 Barros-written, and most of the other 20 (post-Barros) volumes of Décadas da Ásia. For the first two Décadas, both the original (1553) edition and the "modernized" 1778-1788 edition are available; for the rest, only the latter edition.
  Décadas da Ásia (several chapters, about the early exploration) - nead.unama.br
  Décadas da Ásia (2nd Decade, 1st part)  - Google books (Book 1: Tristão da Cunha's expedition to India;  Books 2, 3, 4: Alfonso de Albuquerque in the Arabian Sea (Ormuz) and India; Book 5: conquest of Goa)
  Décadas da Ásia (3nd Decade, 1st part, Books 1-5)  (even though Google Books description mistakenly says this is the 5th Decade!)
  Décadas da Ásia (11th Decade) - Google books
  Partial text of the 3rd Década, Book 2, Chapter VII, "in which is described the land of China, and are related certain things of it, and especially of the city of Canton, which Fernão Pires de Andrade has discovered" - one of the earliest European descriptions of the Ming China. Re-typeset in a modern font, with a slightly modernized orthography.

Portuguese Renaissance humanists
Portuguese chroniclers
Portuguese travel writers
1496 births
1570 deaths
16th-century Portuguese historians
Grammarians from Portugal
Captain-majors of Portuguese Gold Coast
People from Viseu
Maritime history of Portugal
16th century in Ghana
Portuguese exploration in the Age of Discovery
Linguists of Portuguese